The Russian Triangle ( Rusuli samkudhedi) is a 2007 Russian-language Georgian thriller film directed by Aleko Tsabadze. It was Georgia's submission to the 80th Academy Awards for the Academy Award for Best Foreign Language Film, but was not accepted as a nominee. It was also entered into the 29th Moscow International Film Festival where it won the Special Jury Prize.

Plot
Contemporary Russia. The main characters of the film are victims of the recent war who are lost in a city inhabited by millions. In this megalopolis a series of murders occurs. The investigation gradually leads law student Kolya Vorontsov to the track of the sniper-killer. This is Viktor Alyoshin, a former teacher of Russian language and literature in the Chechen school. Having lost his pregnant Chechen wife during the bombing of Grozny, he adopts Islam and goes to the Chechen fighters ... Vorontsov feels that Aleshin's fate is somehow connected with the Maltsev brothers - Denis and Lev, miraculously surviving after the brutal torture and Chechen captivity.
What do these people have in common? And why does the tragedy of 10 years ago completely change the life of Kolya Vorontsov who spent all these years in a city far from military operations? This war demands more and more victims.

Cast
 Artyom Tkachenko as Kolya Vorontsov
 Konstantin Khabenskiy as Denis Maltsev
 Pyotr Mironov as Sniper
 Mikhaïl Jonine as Lev Maltsev
 Oleg Primogenov as Redhead
 Ostap Stupka as Lieutenant Shakalsky
 Oleg Dolin as Philip
 Anatoli Barchuk as Captain Ovcharov
 Ramil Sabitov as Mussa
 Inna Belikova as Polina

See also
Cinema of Georgia
List of Georgian submissions for the Academy Award for Best Foreign Language Film
List of submissions to the 80th Academy Awards for Best Foreign Language Film

References

External links

2007 films
Thriller films from Georgia (country)
2007 thriller films
2000s Russian-language films